Medenine Airfield is an abandoned World War II military airfield in Tunisia, which was located just to the west of Medenine, 46 km N of Tataouine; 430 km south-southeast of Tunis.

History
Medenine Airfield was a French Air Force facility built in Tunisia prior to World War II.  After the Fall of France in June 1940, it was briefly used by the Vichy French Air Force until November 1942 when as part of Case Anton, the military occupation of Vichy France carried out by Germany and Italy, it was taken over by the German Luftwaffe.

During both the American West African Campaign and British Western Desert Campaign, the airfield was attacked repeatedly by elements of the American Twelfth and Ninth Air Forces, along with the British Royal Air Force beginning in late January 1943 with B-24 Liberator heavy bombers, and was strafed with P-40 Warhawk fighter-bombers.  The airfield was seized by  New Zealand Commonwealth ground forces during March 1943.

It was then repaired by Royal Engineers and placed back into operational service.  With the end of combat in Tunisia during the summer or 1943, the airfield was dismantled and abandoned. Today the remains of the main runway is visible on aerial photography, and perhaps some taxiways.

Major units assigned
 French Air Force/Luftwaffe
 Undetermined units
 Royal Air Force
 No. 450 Squadron RAAF (6–14 April 1943)

 United States Army Air Forces (Ninth Air Force)
 12th Bombardment Group, 3–15 April 1943, B-25 Mitchell
 340th Bombardment Group, March–April 1943, B-25 Mitchell
 66th Fighter Squadron (57th Fighter Group), (4–11 April 1943) (P-40 Warhawk)

References

External links

Airfields of the United States Army Air Forces in Tunisia
World War II airfields in Tunisia
Airports established in 1943